John Hartcliffe (1651 – 16 August 1712) was a Canon of Windsor from 1691 to 1712 and Headmaster of Merchant Taylors' School, Northwood.

Career
He was King's Scholar at Eton College then educated at King's College, Cambridge and graduated BA in 1673, MA in 1676, and BD in 1689.

He was appointed:
Headmaster of Merchant Taylors' School 1681 - 1686
Vicar of Twickenham, Middlesex 1708 - 1712

He was appointed to the twelfth stall in St George's Chapel, Windsor Castle in 1691, and held the stall until 1712. He was buried in the chapel.

Publications
He published many of his sermons, and also :

Notes 

1651 births
1712 deaths
Canons of Windsor
Burials at St George's Chapel, Windsor Castle